, or , historically  Opoyakomoi, was a rank among the Yukatchu class of the former Ryukyu Kingdom (modern-day Okinawa, Japan), above the rank of Satunushi and below the rank of Ueekata. As scholar-officials, they often served in administrative positions in the Ryukyuan government. Placed in the upper class, the Pechin would often travel with a servant at their side.

See also
 Arakaki Seishō
 Gushiken surname
 Okinawa Prefecture
 Pechin Higa
 Pechin Takahara
 Ryukyuan people

References

 Okinawa, The History of an Island People by George H. Kerr
 The Language of the Old-Okinawan Omoro Sōshi: Reference Grammar, with Textual Selections, by Rumiko Shinzato and Leon Serafim

External links
 https://web.archive.org/web/20090302085743/http://www.wonder-okinawa.jp/023/eng/001/001/index.html
 http://www.wonder-okinawa.jp/023/eng/003/001/index.html

Ryukyu Kingdom
Titles